Abdul Mahdi Hadi (26 February 1946 – 26 September 2020) was a coach and international Iraqi football player, he also played for Al-Minaa.

International goals
Iraq national football team goals
Scores and results list Iraq's goal tally first.

Coaching career

Managerial statistics

Death 
After contracting COVID-19 during the COVID-19 pandemic in Iraq,  Hadi died on 26 September 2020, at 74 years of age.

Honours

Club
Al-Minaa
Iraqi Premier League: 1977–78

References

External links
  Iraqi national team players database
Al-Minaa Club: Sailors of south

1946 births
2020 deaths
Iraqi footballers
Al-Mina'a SC players
Sportspeople from Basra
Iraq international footballers
Association football forwards
Iraqi football managers
Al-Mina'a SC managers
Deaths from the COVID-19 pandemic in Iraq